Myrtle Creek is a short tributary of the South Umpqua River in Douglas County in the U.S. state of Oregon. Its only named tributaries are the two forks, North Myrtle Creek and South Myrtle Creek, each of which is much longer than the main stem.

The Myrtle Creek watershed contains one of the largest blocks of land overseen by the Bureau of Land Management in western Oregon. The unbroken forest and its stream network provide habitat for species such as coho salmon and the northern spotted owl as well as clean drinking water for humans. Recreation in the watershed includes hiking, mushroom gathering, camping, horseback riding, and a wide variety of other outdoor activities.

In 1990, the City of Myrtle Creek acquired timbers from the former Horse Creek Bridge in Lane County and used them to build a covered bridge over Myrtle Creek. The bridge connects a parking area to the city's Mill Site Park.

North fork
The named tributaries of North Myrtle Creek from source to mouth are Buck Fork followed by Lee, Slide, Frozen, Big Lick, Little Lick, and Bilger creeks.

China Ditch
Gold had been discovered in Douglas County as early as the 1860s. In 1891, China Ditch, a  artificial waterway dug with the help of hundreds of Chinese workers, began diverting water from Little River in the North Umpqua River basin to North Myrtle Creek to make hydraulic dredging with large machines possible near the headwaters during all seasons . By 1894, the project had failed to produce enough gold to meet expenses and closed down.

The Bureau of Land Management oversees an  segment of the ditch that has been preserved. A loop formed by existing county roads—supplemented by a  trail—allows visitors to see remnants of the ditch by automobile. The self-guided loop includes a series of signs detailing the history of the ditch.

South fork
South Myrtle Creek begins at  near Deadman Mountain in the Umpqua National Forest of the Cascade Range, and it flows generally west-southwest. The named tributaries of South Myrtle Creek from source to mouth are Curtin, Johnson, Lally, Weaver, Letitia, Long Wiley, Short Wiley, and Louis creeks, followed by Ben Branch, School Hollow, and Cedar Hollow.

Neal Lane Bridge, a covered bridge, carries Neal Lane over the creek near the city of Myrtle Creek. The  span is the only covered bridge in Oregon with a kingpost truss design.

See also
List of rivers of Oregon

References

External links

Rivers of Oregon
Rivers of Douglas County, Oregon